The year 660 BC was a year of the pre-Julian Roman calendar. In the Roman Empire, it was known as year 94 Ab urbe condita . The denomination 660 BC for this year has been used since the early medieval period, when the Anno Domini calendar era became the prevalent method in Europe for naming years.

Events
 Extreme solar particle event comparable with the event detected at AD 774/775
 February 11 - The accession date of the first Emperor of Japan, Emperor Jimmu, converted from the Japanese imperial year as calculated by the dates in the Nihon Shoki.

Births

Deaths
 Duke Cheng of Qin, ruler of the state of Qin

References